Gianfrancesco Sanseverino was a Roman Catholic prelate who served as Bishop of Acerra (1556–1559).

Biography
On 6 July 1556, Gianfrancesco Sanseverino was appointed during the papacy of Pope Paul IV as Bishop of Acerra.
He served as Bishop of Acerra until his resignation in 1559.

References

External links and additional sources
 (for Chronology of Bishops) 
 (for Chronology of Bishops) 

16th-century Italian Roman Catholic bishops
Bishops appointed by Pope Paul IV